HMS E45 was a British E class submarine built by Cammell Laird, Birkenhead. She was launched on 25 January 1916 and was commissioned in August 1916. E45 torpedoed U-boat  in the North Sea on 15 October 1917. E45 was sold in South Wales on 6 September 1922.

Design
She was powered by two  Vickers eight-cylinder two-stroke diesel engines and two  electric motors.

E45 was armed with a 12-pounder  QF gun mounted forward of the conning tower. She had five 18 inch (450 mm) torpedo tubes, two in the bow, one either side amidships, and one in the stern; a total of 10 torpedoes were carried.

E-Class submarines had wireless systems with  power ratings; in some submarines, these were later upgraded to  systems by removing a midship torpedo tube. Their maximum design depth was  although in service some reached depths of below . Some submarines contained Fessenden oscillator systems.

References

Bibliography
 

 

British E-class submarines of the Royal Navy
Ships built on the River Mersey
1916 ships
World War I submarines of the United Kingdom
Royal Navy ship names